The Granite Store is a historic building located at 110 Hecla Street, in Uxbridge, Massachusetts.

Description and history 
This  story granite building was constructed c. 1850–60, and may have been built by the Spaulding Company, who owned the nearby mill complex. It is distinctive locally as a granite structure in a residential area of predominantly wood-frame houses, and for its uses as a company store and meeting space (above). The building has since been converted to residential use.

It was added to the National Register of Historic Places on October 7, 1983.

See also
National Register of Historic Places listings in Uxbridge, Massachusetts

References

Commercial buildings on the National Register of Historic Places in Massachusetts
Buildings and structures in Uxbridge, Massachusetts
Retail buildings in Massachusetts
National Register of Historic Places in Uxbridge, Massachusetts
Company stores in the United States